Boubacar Rafael Neto Hanne (born 26 February 1999) is a Portuguese professional footballer who plays for Liga I club Argeș Pitești as a left winger.

Early life
Hanne was born in Paços de Ferreira, Porto District, to Senegalese footballer Hanne Tanou and a Portuguese mother. He joined F.C. Paços de Ferreira's youth system at the age of 8.

Club career
On 18 July 2017, Hanne and his compatriot Pedro Gonçalves signed two-year contracts with English club Wolverhampton Wanderers, being assigned to the under-23 team. He never appeared competitively for the main squad during his tenure, being loaned to FC Jumilla in the Spanish Segunda División B and Grasshopper Club Zürich in the Swiss Challenge League.

Hanne returned to his country on 7 August 2020, joining Gil Vicente F.C. on a three-year deal. He made his Primeira Liga debut on 27 September, coming on as a 75th-minute substitute for Antoine Leautey in a 1–0 home win against Portimonense SC. He scored his first goal in the competition 15 months later, closing the 3–0 away victory over C.D. Tondela.

On 11 January 2023, Hanne agreed to a one-and-a-half-year contract at Liga I club FC Argeș Pitești.

References

External links

1999 births
Living people
People from Paços de Ferreira
Portuguese people of Senegalese descent
Portuguese sportspeople of African descent
Black Portuguese sportspeople
Sportspeople from Porto District
Portuguese footballers
Association football wingers
Primeira Liga players
F.C. Paços de Ferreira players
Gil Vicente F.C. players
Wolverhampton Wanderers F.C. players
Segunda División B players
Tercera División players
FC Jumilla players
Grasshopper Club Zürich players
Liga I players
FC Argeș Pitești players
Portuguese expatriate footballers
Expatriate footballers in England
Expatriate footballers in Spain
Expatriate footballers in Switzerland
Expatriate footballers in Romania
Portuguese expatriate sportspeople in England
Portuguese expatriate sportspeople in Spain
Portuguese expatriate sportspeople in Switzerland
Portuguese expatriate sportspeople in Romania